This is the Uttar Pradesh Council of Ministers headed by the Chief Minister of Uttar Pradesh, Mulayam Singh Yadav from 1989 to 1991.

Chief Minister & Cabinet Ministers 
 Mulayam Singh Yadav - Chief Minister
 Rewati Raman Singh - Irrigation, Medium Enterprises, Environment
 Ram Sharan Dass - Sugarcane Development, Revenue
 Beni Prasad Verma - Public Works, Parliamentary Affairs, Excise
 Sachidanand Bajpai - Education, Youth Development
 Mukhtar Anis - Public Health, Medical
 Sukhda Mishra - Rural Development, Panchayati Raj
 Avdhesh Prasad - Harijan and Social Welfare
 Diwakar Vikram Singh - Food and Logistics
 Azam Khan - Labour, Muslim Wakf
 Vikramaditya Pandey - Urban Development
 Barfiya Lal Juwantha - Hill Development
 Mohd Aslam Khan - Forest, Sports
 Shatrudra Prakash - Planning, Prison

See also
 Second Mulayam Singh Yadav ministry

References

Mulayam
Janata Dal state ministries
1989 establishments in Uttar Pradesh
Cabinets established in 1989